The Russian (rus. Русский) is a fictional character, a supervillain appearing in American comic books published by Marvel Comics. He is an enemy of the Punisher.

Publication history
Created by Garth Ennis and Steve Dillon, the character made his first appearance in The Punisher Vol. 5, #8 (November 2000).

The Russian debuted off-panel in The Punisher Vol. 5, #8, was fully introduced in the following issue, and appeared in every subsequent one up until his death in Issue #11. In the following series, the character was resurrected as a cyborg, and was featured in The Punisher Vol. 6, #1-5.

The Russian received profiles in Marvel Encyclopedia #5, All-New Official Handbook of the Marvel Universe #9, and Official Handbook of the Marvel Universe A-Z #9

Fictional character biography
The earliest known sightings of the Russian occurred while he was vacationing in Afghanistan in the 1980s. He subsequently traveled the world, inserting himself into various conflicts for fun and profit; locations he is said to have fought in include Lebanon, Iraq, Rwanda, East Timor, Chechnya, the Balkans, and Belfast (where he consumed a man on a bet). The Russian's activities led to him being wanted dead or alive by numerous law enforcement agencies, as well as criminal organizations such as the Yakuza.

The Russian is contacted at his home in Kazakhstan by American crime lord Ma Gnucci, who offers him ten million dollars to kill the Punisher. The Russian agrees to the deal, boards a Russian airliner to North America, crashes it above Canada, and crosses the border into New York City, where he is briefed by Gnucci. The Russian is then brought to the Punisher's current address, and engages the vigilante, their fight (which the Russian dominates) bringing them into the apartment of the Punisher's morbidly obese neighbor, Mr. Bumpo. The Punisher burns the Russian's face with a hot pizza that Bumpo had been dining on, trips him, and then throws Bumpo on top of him. The Russian asphyxiates under Bumpo, and has his head cut off by the Punisher, who uses it to intimidate what remains of Ma Gnucci's forces into surrendering.

The Russian's remains are recovered by General Kreigkopf, who resurrects him as a cyborg using technology stolen from S.H.I.E.L.D. Side-effects of the experimental hormone treatments he is given to stabilize his reinvigorated and improved body cause the Russian to develop breasts (which he adores) and an implied form of menstruation, which prompts him to begin wearing women's clothing, including high heels. To test the Russian's capabilities, Kreigkopf approves his request to return to New York City to kill the Punisher, who the Russian throws off of the Empire State Building. The Punisher is saved by Spider-Man, and in the battle that ensues he wields the superhero as a human shield, and uses his web-shooters to knock the Russian off of the skyscraper. The Russian survives crashing through the street below and being hit by a subway train, and retreats to Kreigkopf's base on Grand Nixon Island. The Russian is repaired, and denied another chance to face the Punisher.

The Russian is placed on a Boeing 747 full of soldiers that Kreigkopf intends to have attack the European Union in Brussels. The Punisher, who had tracked the Russian down, forces the airplane to crash into Grand Nixon Island's fuel depot; the Russian emerges from the wreckage as the only survivor. When Kreigkopf improvises his attack plan by ordering that a French airplane carrying a nuclear warhead be hijacked, the Punisher boards the aircraft, followed by the Russian. The Punisher blows out the back of the Russian's head by shoving a gun into his mouth, then chains him to the atomic bomb and drops it on Grand Nixon. The island and all of the criminals on it are obliterated, as is the Russian, whose last words are, "Dosvidanja, Big Boy! The Russian really has to hand it to you!"

Powers and abilities
In his first storyline, the Russian possessed tremendous strength and durability; he singlehandedly wipes out a Bravo Force team, unintentionally crushes a man with a friendly gesture, smacks the Punisher with a toilet he had ripped out of its foundation, and tears apart a revolver, while also being unfazed by being kicked in the crotch, stabbed in the stomach, and bludgeoned with a chair. Additionally, he alludes to surviving freefalling from an airplane, and being repeatedly shot in the head. Despite his nigh-invulnerability, the Russian was sensitive to heat, becoming enraged when the Punisher successfully injured him with a stove, and a hot pizza.

When General Kreigkopf resurrected the Russian, he had his body augmented with plastics and adamantium, replaced most of his organs with ones taken from animals, and gave him olfactory sensors that increased his sense of smell to the level of a bloodhound's.

Obsession with American culture
In his initial comic appearances, the Russian was shown to have an obsession with American pop culture. His first thoughts upon being offered $10 million to kill the Punisher was a realization of how many pairs of Levi's and Compact Discs he could buy with that amount. The Russian is also a self-confessed superhero fan. He is the president of "The Daredevil, Man Without Fear, Fan Club" of Smolensk. He also wished to gain autographs from the X-Men, the Fantastic Four, and Spider-Man. He also believes Thor would make a good communist because of his big hammer.

Other versions

Marvel MAX
A flashback sequence in  The Punisher Vol. 7, #75 depicts the Punisher fighting the Russian, who tries to break his back. The circumstances surrounding the battle, as well as how it is resolved, are not revealed.

Marvel Noir
In Punisher Noir, the Russian is a soldier turned independent mercenary who, after World War I, is sent after Frank Castelione, who is on a locomotive headed for England. A fight ensues and moves to the top of the train, where Frank shoves a grenade into the crotch of the Russian's pants, and pushes him off of the vehicle. Years later, the Russian, now identifying as female, helps Jigsaw and Barracuda murder Frank at the behest of mob boss Dutch Schultz.

Frank's son, Frank Castelione Jr., grows up to become the Punisher, and discovers the Russian's connection to his father's death after tracking down and killing Barracuda and Jigsaw. The Punisher confronts the Russian at the Bronx Zoo, and their fight brings them into the reptile exhibit, where the Russian is mauled by alligators. Despite losing an arm, the Russian continues to try to attack the Punisher, who finishes her off by emptying two fully loaded guns into him. Frank, Jr. then stages the scene to make it look like the Russian was the Punisher all along.

In other media

Film

The Russian appears in the 2004 live-action film The Punisher, portrayed by professional wrestler Kevin Nash. He has no on-screen dialogue and is sent by mob boss Howard Saint to dispose of Punisher. Powering through everything that the vigilante throws at him, the Russian beats the Punisher to near death with his bare hands, and numerous objects. The Punisher gains the upper hand when he hurls a pot of pasta in boiling water on the Russian's face; while the Russian is incapacitated by pain, he is knocked down a flight of stairs, the fall breaking his neck.

Video game
The Russian appears in The Punisher video game, voiced by Darryl Kurylo. In the game, he is working for General Kreigkopf, and has lines (most of them relating to his favorite superheroes). The Russian is fought twice as a boss, the second battle ending with him being blown up by a nuclear device that was smuggled onto Grand Nixon Island.

References

External links
 Russian at Marvel Wiki
 Russian at Comic Vine
 

Marvel Comics supervillains
Marvel Comics cyborgs
Fictional assassins in comics
Fictional cannibals
Punisher characters
Fictional mass murderers
Fictional mercenaries in comics
Fictional murdered people
Fictional Russian people
Characters created by Garth Ennis
Comics characters introduced in 2000
Marvel Comics male supervillains
Marvel Comics characters with superhuman strength
Cyborg supervillains